The chopi blackbird (Gnorimopsar chopi) is a species of bird in the family Icteridae. It is monotypic within the genus Gnorimopsar. It is found in Argentina, Bolivia, Brazil, Paraguay, Peru, and Uruguay.
Its natural habitats are dry savanna, subtropical or tropical seasonally wet or flooded lowland grassland, pastureland, and heavily degraded former forest.

It is similar to the Forbes's blackbird but has a slightly curved bill with a groove along the lower mandible. The call is a loud explosive "tjouw", either given as a single call or as a series that vary randomly in pitch.

The diet of this species is poorly known, but they have been observed feeding on arthropods and fruit, and there are recorded instances of them feeding on frogs and even preying on birds.

References

External links

chopi blackbird
chopi blackbird
Birds of Argentina
Birds of Bolivia
Birds of Brazil
Birds of Paraguay
Birds of Uruguay
chopi blackbird
Taxa named by Louis Jean Pierre Vieillot
Taxonomy articles created by Polbot